Australian moths represent between 20,000 and 30,000 different types of moths. In comparison, there are only 400 species of Australian butterflies. The moths (mostly nocturnal) and butterflies (mostly diurnal) together make up the taxonomic order Lepidoptera. Scientifically, these moths are organised into about 80 families, but the status of some is controversial and several recent changes have been suggested.

This is a list of moth species which have been recorded in Australia. The list covers the continent of Australia and Tasmania and includes islands close to the mainland.

This page provides a link to detailed lists of these moths by family. If a family is endemic to Australia, the link redirects to a description of the family itself.

Families
Adelidae
Agathiphagidae
Only one Australian species is known: Agathiphaga queenslandensis Dumbleton, 1952
Agonoxenidae
Only one Australian species is known: Agonoxena phoenicia Bradley, 1966
Alucitidae
Anomosetidae
Anthelidae
Arctiidae
Argyresthiidae (mostly treated as a subfamily of Yponomeutidae)
Only one Australian species is known: Argyresthia notoleuca (Turner, 1913)
Arrhenophanidae
Only one Australian species is known: Notiophanes fuscata Davis and Edwards, 2003
Batrachedridae
Blastobasidae
Blastodacnidae (sometimes included in Agonoxenidae)
Bombycidae
Only three Australian species are known: Bombyx mori (Linnaeus, 1758), Gastridiota adoxima (Turner, 1902) and an unnamed Elachyophthalma species.
Brachodidae
Bucculatricidae
Carposinidae
Carthaeidae
Castniidae
Choreutidae
Coleophoridae
Copromorphidae
Cosmopterigidae
Cossidae
Cyclotornidae
Depressariidae (mostly considered a subfamily of Oecophoridae)
Drepanidae
Douglasiidae
Only one Australian species is known: Tinagma leucanthes Meyrick, 1897
Dudgeoneidae
Elachistidae
Epermeniidae
Epipyropidae
Erebidae
Eriocottidae
Only one Australian species is known: Eucryptogona trichobathra Lower, 1901
Ethmiidae
Eupterotidae
Galacticidae
Gelechiidae
Geometridae
Glyphipterigidae
Gracillariidae
Heliocosma group
Heliodinidae
Heliozelidae
Hepialidae
Herminiidae (mostly considered a subfamily of Noctuidae)
Hyblaeidae
Hypertrophidae (mostly considered a subfamily of Oecophoridae)
Immidae
Incurvariidae
Lacturidae
Lasiocampidae
Lecithoceridae
Limacodidae
Lophocoronidae
Lymantriidae
Lyonetiidae
Macropiratidae
Only one Australian species is known: Agdistopis halieutica (Meyrick, 1932)
Micronoctuidae
Only few Australian species are known: Duplex horakae Fibiger, 2010, Duplex edwardsi Fibiger, 2010, Duplex pullata Fibiger, 2010, Duplex cockingi Fibiger, 2010 and Flax kalliesi Fibiger, 2011. Records for Tolpia conscitulana Walker, 1863 and Tolpia myops Hampson, 1907, formerly included in Noctuidae, are based on misidentifications.
Micropterigidae
The following Australian species are known: Austromartyria porphyrodes (Turner, 1932), Aureopterix sterops (Turner, 1921) and the species in the genus Tasmantrix.
Momphidae
Only an unnamed Zapyrastra species is known.
Nepticulidae
Noctuidae (including Aganaidae and Nolidae)
Notodontidae
Oecophoridae
Oenosandridae
Opostegidae
Palaeosetidae
Only one Australian species is known: Palaeoses scholastica Turner, 1922.
Palaephatidae
Plutellidae
Psychidae
Pterophoridae
Pyralidae (including Crambidae)
Roeslerstammiidae
Saturniidae
Scythrididae
Sesiidae
Simaethistidae
Only two Australian species are known: Metaprotus asuridia (Butler, 1886) and Metaprotus magnifica (Meyrick, 1887)
Sphingidae
Symmocidae
Only one Australian species is known: Nemotyla oribates Nielsen, McQuillan & Common, 1992
Thyrididae
Tineidae
Tineodidae
Tortricidae
Uraniidae
Yponomeutidae
Zygaenidae

See also
List of butterflies of Australia
List of butterflies of Tasmania
List of butterflies of Victoria

Notes and references

Further reading

External links
Australian Moths Online CSIRO Ecosystem Sciences

 
Moths
Australia
Moths
Australia